James Finney may refer to:

 Jim Finney (1924–2008), English football referee
 James Finney (swimmer) (1862–?), English swimmer in the 1880s